Lee Ching-hua (born 3 December 1948) is a Taiwanese politician.

Family and education
Lee Ching-hua was born on 3 December 1948, the second child to Lee Huan and Pan Hsiang-ning. He had one older brother, Lee Ching-chung, and two younger sisters, Lee Ching-chu and Diane Lee. Lee Ching-hua earned a bachelor's degree in law from National Chengchi University before furthering his education in the United States, where he obtained a doctorate in history from New York University. Lee then returned to Taiwan and became an associate professor at NCCU.

Political career
Lee was elected to the Legislative Yuan for the first time in 1992. He, Chen Kuei-miao, and others broke away from the Kuomintang to found the New Party the next year.  He joined James Soong's People First Party in 2000 to support Soong's first presidential bid, but continued serving as the leader of the New Party's national election and development committee during the 2000 election. Lee left the PFP in May 2005 and rejoined the Kuomintang. Lee lost his legislative seat to Huang Kuo-chang of the New Power Party in 2016. The next year, Wu Den-yih named Lee a spokesman for Wu's KMT chairmanship bid.

Controversy
In September 2018, Lee was indicted on charges of corruption by the New Taipei City District Prosecutors’ Office, and accused of embezzling NT$5.23 million, an amount meant to pay for his legislative assistants' salaries.

References

1948 births
Living people
Republic of China politicians from Zhejiang
Members of the 2nd Legislative Yuan
Members of the 4th Legislative Yuan
Members of the 3rd Legislative Yuan
Members of the 5th Legislative Yuan
Members of the 6th Legislative Yuan
Members of the 7th Legislative Yuan
Members of the 8th Legislative Yuan
New Party Members of the Legislative Yuan
Taipei Members of the Legislative Yuan
New Taipei Members of the Legislative Yuan
People First Party Members of the Legislative Yuan
Kuomintang Members of the Legislative Yuan in Taiwan
Academic staff of the National Chengchi University
National Chengchi University alumni
New York University alumni
Taiwanese political party founders
Leaders of the New Party (Taiwan)